The 1920 Chicago Cardinals season was the Cardinals' inaugural season in the American Professional Football Association (soon to be the National Football League). The team finished 6–2–1, earning fourth in the league. Their final two games of the season against the Chicago Stayms Foresters were played after the APFA season was officially over and did not count towards the standings.

Although the Cardinals' existence traced back as far as 1899, this was their first season as a member of the American Professional Football Association.

The last remaining active member of the 1920 Chicago Cardinals was Paddy Driscoll, who retired after the 1929 season.

Offseason 
The Chicago Cardinals finished 4–3-0 in their 1919 season in the Chicago Football league Following the 1919 season, representatives of four Ohio League teams—the Canton Bulldogs, the Cleveland Tigers, the Dayton Triangles, and the Akron Pros—called a meeting on August 20, 1920, to discuss the formation of a new league. At the meeting, they tentatively agreed on a salary cap and pledged not to sign college players or players already under contract with other teams. They also agreed on a name for the circuit: the American Professional Football Conference. Then they contacted other major professional teams and invited them to a meeting for September 17.

At that meeting, held at Bulldogs owner Ralph Hay's Hupmobile showroom in Canton, representatives of the Rock Island Independents, the Muncie Flyers, the Decatur Staleys, the Massillon Tigers, the Cardinals, and the Hammond Pros agreed to join the league. Representatives of the Buffalo All-Americans and Rochester Jeffersons could not attend the meeting, but sent letters to Hay asking to be included in the league. Team representatives changed the league's name slightly to the American Professional Football Association and elected officers, installing Jim Thorpe as president. Under the new league structure, teams created their schedules dynamically as the season progressed, and representatives of each team voted to determine the winner of the APFA trophy. After joining the league, manager Chris O'Brien signed halfback John "Paddy" Driscoll for $3,000. One of Driscoll's young running backs was Ralph Horween, who previously played under the name of B. McMahon at Harvard University.

Schedule

Game summaries

Week 3: at Chicago Tigers

Week 4: vs. Moline Universal Tractors

Week 5: at Rock Island Independents

Week 6: vs. Detroit Heralds

Week 7: vs. Chicago Tigers

Week 8: vs. Cincinnati Celts

Week 9: vs. Lansing Oldsmobile

Week 10: vs. Decatur Staleys

Week 11: vs. Decatur Staleys

Week 13: at Chicago Stayms

Week 14: vs. Chicago Stayms

Standings

Roster

Post season

Notes

References

Further reading 
 

Arizona Cardinals seasons
Chicago Cardinals
Chicago Card